Dzisna is a town in the Vitebsk Region of Belarus. It is located on the left bank of the Daugava River, near the confluence of Dysna.

It has 1,500 inhabitants (2017 estimate) which has declined as in the 20th century it had close to 10,000 inhabitants. Dzisna is the smallest town of Belarus.

History
Within the Grand Duchy of Lithuania, Dzisna was part of Połock Voivodeship. In the 16th century, King of Poland and Lithuanian Grand Duke Sigismund II Augustus granted Dzisna city rights. It was a royal city of Lithuania. In 1793, Dzisna was acquired by the Russian Empire as a result of the Second Partition of Poland.

From 1921 until 1939, Dzisna was part of the Second Polish Republic. In September 1939, the town was occupied by the Red Army and, on 14 November 1939, incorporated into the Byelorussian SSR.

From 5 July 1941 until 4 July 1944, Dzisna was occupied by Nazi Germany and administered as a part of the Generalbezirk Weißruthenien of Reichskommissariat Ostland, after which it returned under Soviet control. On June 14, 1942, thousands of Jews in Dzisna were murdered by the Nazi SS and local Belorussian collaborators. After 1944, Dzisna remained part of the Soviet Union until 1991.

References

External links

 

Disnensky Uyezd
Holocaust locations in Belarus
Miory District
Polotsk Voivodeship
Populated places in Vitebsk Region
Towns in Belarus
Wilno Voivodeship (1926–1939)